The Oceanimonas are a genus of marine bacteria. They are, like all Proteobacteria, gram-negative. The rod-shaped, motile organisms are aerobic and chemoorganotroph.

References

External links 
J.P. Euzéby: List of Prokaryotic names with Standing in Nomenclature

Alteromonadales